Elections for the City of Edinburgh District Council took place in 1974, alongside elections to the councils of Scotland's various other districts. These were the first election to the City of Edinburgh District Council, and saw the Conservatives winning 30 of the Councils 64 seats.

Aggregate results

Ward Results

References

1974
Edinburgh
District Council election, 1974